Dennis O'Neill is a World Cup winning former professional rugby league footballer who played in the 1960s and 1970s.

Playing career

International honours
Dennis O'Neill won caps for Great Britain while at Widnes in 1971 against New Zealand, and in the 1972 Rugby League World Cup against Australia (1-try), and France.

Challenge Cup Final appearances
Dennis O'Neill played as an interchange/substitute, i.e. number 14, (replacing , i.e. number 2, Alan Prescott) in Widnes' 5-20 defeat by St, Helens in the 1975–76 Challenge Cup, London Final during the 1975–76 season at Wembley Stadium, London on Saturday 8 May 1976, in front of a crowd of 89,982, and played , i.e number 5, in the 7-16 defeat by Leeds in the 1976–77 Challenge Cup Final during the 1976–77 season at Wembley Stadium, London on Saturday 7 May 1977, in front of a crowd of 80,871.

County Cup Final appearances
Dennis O'Neill played , and scored a try in Widnes 8-15 defeat by Wigan in the 1971–72 Lancashire County Cup Final during the 1970–71 season at Knowsley Road, St. Helens on Saturday 28 August 1971, and played right-, i.e. number 3, in the 6-2 victory over Salford in the 1974–75 Lancashire County Cup Final during the 1974–75 season at Central Park, Wigan on Saturday 2 November 1974.

BBC2 Floodlit Trophy Final appearances
Dennis O'Neill played , i.e. number 2, in Widnes' 7-15 defeat by Bramley in the 1973 BBC2 Floodlit Trophy Final during the 1973–74 season at Naughton Park, Widnes on Tuesday 18 December 1973.

Player's No.6 Trophy Final appearances
Dennis O'Neill played right-, i.e. number 3, in  Widnes' 2-3 defeat by Bradford Northern in the 1974–75 Player's No.6 Trophy Final during the 1974–75 season at Wilderspool Stadium, Warrington on Saturday 25 January 1975.

Genealogical information
Dennis O'Neill is the brother of the rugby league footballer James "Jim"/"Jimmy" O'Neill.

References

External links
!Great Britain Statistics at englandrl.co.uk (statistics currently missing due to not having appeared for both Great Britain, and England)
Statistics at rugby.widnes.tv

Living people
English rugby league players
Great Britain national rugby league team players
Lancashire rugby league team players
Oldham R.L.F.C. players
Place of birth missing (living people)
Rugby league five-eighths
Widnes Vikings players
Year of birth missing (living people)